Kellie Gerardi is an American aerospace, defense, and technology professional and a popular science communicator. She is a citizen scientist and conducts bioastronautics research and spacesuit evaluation in microgravity with the International Institute of Astronautical Sciences (IIAS). She is a Director of The Explorers Club and serves on the Defense Council for the Truman National Security Project. She is the author of Not Necessarily Rocket Science: A Beginner's Guide To Life in the Space Age and the children's picture book series Luna Muna. Gerardi's work to promote space exploration and encourage women in STEM has attracted thousands of followers on TikTok and Instagram.

Career
Gerardi led an industry study for DARPA, exploring the budgetary, technical, and programmatic components of the XS-1 program. She later led business development for Masten Space Systems, a prime contractor on the program.

Gerardi joined Palantir Technologies in 2015. She served as the Technical Project Manager for Palantir's Philanthropy portfolio, including deployments with organizations whose missions include countering the illicit trafficking of goods and money by transnational criminal networks; aiding local law enforcement in quickly solving child abduction and exploitation cases; and aiding real-time mission planning for first responders during natural disasters. In 2017, she deployed to Houston, TX as part of Team Rubicon’s Hurricane Harvey response, code-named “Operation Hard Hustle”, in which Palantir's Gotham product helped Team Rubicon power live boat rescues. She holds a leadership role in global Mission Operations.

Gerardi leads Special Projects for the Commercial Spaceflight Federation and serves on the Defense Council for the Truman National Security Project.

Gerardi is also a Director of The Explorers Club and serves on the Space Committee. In 2014 she became the youngest member to co-chair The Explorers Club Annual Dinner (ECAD). Gerardi co-chaired the 110th and 111th Explorers Club Annual Dinners, in which the Club honored space entrepreneurs Elon Musk and Jeff Bezos, as well as scientific luminaries Stephen Hawking and Neil deGrasse Tyson. In 2020, she joined The Explorers Club's Board of Directors.

Microgravity research 
In 2017, Gerardi joined the International Institute of Astronautical Sciences (IIAS), a citizen-science institute specializing in aeronomy, bioastronautics, operational science, and science education. Gerardi received instruction on bioastronautics, spacesuit operations, crew resource management, and completed an intensive training program including high-G training, high-altitude training, pressurized spacesuit training, biometric analysis, and instrumentation operations.

Gerardi has flown in a series of microgravity research flights in partnership with the National Research Council (Canada) and the Canadian Space Agency in Ottawa. In 2018, Gerardi was a Suited Test Subject, flying fully pressurized in a Final Frontier Design IVA spacesuit while conducting a number of experiments in microgravity related to fluid configuration, solid body rotation, and biometrics. Notably, Gerardi tested the Canadian Space Agency's "Bio-Monitor" smart garment, an experiment which launched to the International Space Station in December 2018 with Canadian Astronaut David Saint-Jacques.

Mars research
In February 2015, Gerardi joined an international research team for the 149th crew rotation at the Mars Desert Research Station, a prototype laboratory used by a variety of national space agencies to conduct analog Martian field research and simulate long-duration spaceflight. The seven researchers in Crew 149 spent two weeks in isolation and performed a variety of scientific experiments, including a forced plant growth study and a survey of extremophiles and cyanobacteria in nearby lichen colonies. Gerardi's crew proved root germination and growth of sorghum seeds and hops rhizomes in Martian regolith simulant, becoming the first team of researchers to demonstrate the ability to produce beer on Mars. Crew 149 also hosted English comedy television star Karl Pilkington as an honorary crew member, appearing in Season 2, Episode 6 of The Moaning of Life.

In 2013, Gerardi was among 1,058 applicants selected as potential crew members for Mars One, a private company proposing to establish a human colony on Mars. In 2015, Gerardi was among 100 named finalists but distanced herself from the organization.

Media and outreach
In 2015, Gerardi was named a "Rising Talent" by the Women's Forum for the Economy and Society, an international initiative aiming to distinguish talented young women on their way to becoming influential figures in global economies and societies.

Following the publication of her first book in 2020, Gerardi hosted a virtual book tour with museums and science institutions across the United States, including the Museum of Science, the Exploratorium, COSI, and the Museum of Flight. In 2021, Gerardi partnered with NASA to host the first all-female episode of NASA Science Live during Women's History Month.

Personal life
Gerardi's 2015 wedding to Steven Baumruk was officiated by American astronaut and former International Space Station Commander Michael López-Alegría in a space-themed ceremony in Woodstock, Vermont. The reception included a recorded dinner toast from NASA astronaut Scott Kelly aboard the International Space Station.

Gerardi and Baumruk live in Jupiter, Florida with their daughter Delta V. Baumruk, whose name is a reference to delta-v in spacecraft flight dynamics.

References

External links
 Nachgefragt bei... Kellie Gerardi
 What I Learned Living Through a Simulated Mars Mission

1989 births
Living people
People from Jupiter, Florida
Women space scientists\
Tisch School of the Arts alumni
Astronautics
Space scientists
Social media influencers
Science communicators